The Museum of Ethnography, in Stockholm, Sweden, is a Swedish science museum.  It houses a collection of about 220,000 items relating to the ethnography, or cultural anthropology, of peoples from around the world, including from China, Korea, South and Southeast Asia, the Pacific region, the Americas and Africa. The museum is situated in Museiparken at Gärdet in Stockholm. Since 1999, it is a part of Swedish National Museums of World Culture and is also hosting the Sven Hedin Foundation. The museum is open Tuesday to Sunday 11:00AM – 5:00 PM, and Wednesdays 11:00 AM – 8:00 PM and is closed on Mondays.

Among the oldest collections at the museum are objects gathered during the Cook expeditions in the 18th century. However, the main part stems from the period 1850–1950 and is heavily influenced by the colonial era explorations, evangelisations and trade. When the museum first opened in 1930 it was the result of a long pre-history of lobby work from among others Hjalmar Stolpe and Erland Nordenskiöld, several huge public exhibitions and a growing concern for the inadequate keeping of ethnographic collections on many hands.

In 2007, after several years of negotiation, the museum agreed to return a totem pole to the Haisla Nation, from which it has been taken in 1929. The Haisla nation gave the museum a contemporary replica of the pole, currently on display outside the museum's entrance. The museum has also returned a number of other objects to their country of origin. All current artifacts in the museum are considered national property and so the museum has a right and a responsibility to display and preserve these artifacts.

The museum is expanding on its collection with the addition of a digital exhibition. This exhibition explores the role and significance of birds in material culture, society and somolog.

See also 
 Museums in Stockholm

References

External links 

  (Official site)
  (Official site)

Museums in Stockholm
Ethnographic museums in Europe